Brad Barkley, a native of North Carolina, is the author of the novel, Money, Love (Norton), a Barnes and Noble "Discover Great New Writers" selection and a "BookSense 76" choice.  Money, Love was named one of the best books of 2000 by the Washington Post and the Library Journal. Brad was named one of the “Breakthrough Writers You Need To Know” by Book Magazine.  His novel Alison's Automotive Repair Manual (St. Martin’s) was also a "BookSense 76" selection.  He has published two collections of short stories, Circle View (SMU Press) and Another Perfect Catastrophe (St. Martin’s).  His short fiction has appeared in nearly thirty magazines, including  Southern Review, Georgia Review, the Oxford American, Glimmer Train, Book Magazine, and the Virginia Quarterly Review, which twice awarded him the Emily Balch Prize for Best Fiction.  His work has been anthologized in New Stories from the South: The Year's Best, 2002.  His first YA novel, Scrambled Eggs At Midnight, co-authored with Heather Hepler, was published in May 2006 by Penguin, and was a summer 2006 “Booksense 76” choice.  His second YA novel, Dream Factory, published in spring 2007, was also “BookSense 76” selection, a Library Guild “Book of the Month, pick” and was voted the Texas Institute of Arts and Letters “Best Young Adult Book” for 2007.  Their most recent title, Jars of Glass, was recently published by Dutton-Penguin.  He has received four Individual Artist Awards from the Maryland State Arts Council, and a creative writing fellowship from the National Endowment for the Arts. He is the author of the novels Money, Love (Norton) and Alison's Automotive Repair Manual (St. Martins), as well as two short-story collections and three Young Adult novels.  His short fiction has appeared in such magazines as Glimmer Train, the Southern Review, and The Oxford American.

Bibliography

Alison's Automotive Repair Manual St. Martins. 2003. 
Another Perfect Catastrophe and Other Stories. St. Martins-Thomas Dunne. 2004.

Notes

External links 
 Barkley's website
 Barkley at Macmillan Books website
 Barkley at Frostburg State University faculty website

University of North Carolina at Greensboro alumni
University of Arkansas alumni
Frostburg State University faculty
Living people
Year of birth missing (living people)